The 2018–19 Summit League men's basketball season began with practices in October 2018, followed by the start of the 2018–19 NCAA Division I men's basketball season in November. Conference play begins in January 2019 and concludes in February 2019. The season marked the 36th season of Summit League basketball.

On December 7, 2018, Mike Daum became the Summit League’s all-time leading scorer. In a 42-point outing against Southern, Daum passed former Oral Roberts forward Caleb Green’s conference record 2,504 points.

Preseason

Preseason poll 
Source

() first place votes

Preseason All-Conference Teams 
Source

Summit League Preseason Player of the Year: Mike Daum (South Dakota State)

Regular season

Conference matrix

Season summary & highlights

Conference regular season

Midseason watchlists

Postseason

Summit League Tournament

Highlights

NCAA Tournament

National Invitation Tournament

Awards and honors

References